Sifiso Sandile Hlanti (born 1 May 1990) is a South African professional soccer player who plays for Kaizer Chiefs as a left back.

Club career
Born in Durban, Hlanti has played for Lamontville Golden Arrows, Chippa United, Thanda Royal Zulu, AmaZulu, Bidvest Wits and Moroka Swallows.

In September 2020 he began training with Kaizer Chiefs, despite the club being under a transfer ban. He was one of 6 players to sign for the club on 9 July 2021, following the lifting of the transfer ban.

International career
He made his international debut for South Africa in 2016. After playing in a match at the 2019 Africa Cup of Nations, Hlanti's Wikipedia entry was the subject of vandalism.

Career statistics

International

References

1990 births
Living people
Soccer players from Durban
South African soccer players
South Africa international soccer players
Lamontville Golden Arrows F.C. players
Chippa United F.C. players
Thanda Royal Zulu F.C. players
AmaZulu F.C. players
Bidvest Wits F.C. players
Moroka Swallows F.C. players
Kaizer Chiefs F.C. players
South African Premier Division players
National First Division players
Association football fullbacks
2019 Africa Cup of Nations players